Walldürn is a town in the Neckar-Odenwald district, in Baden-Württemberg, Germany. It is situated 23 km southwest of Wertheim.
The town of Walldürn consists of the ten districts Walldürn-Stadt, Altheim, Gerolzahn, Glashofen, Gottersdorf, Hornbach, Kaltenbrunn, Reinhardsachsen, Rippberg and Wettersdorf. 
Walldürn Basilica:

Local council
Elections in 2014:

The poll was 52,9 %. 
CDU: 13 seats
SPD:  9 seats
Demokratische Christliche Bürger (DCB): 5 seats
Free voters Baden-Württemberg|Walldürner Bürgervereinigung (WBV): 2 seats
Walldürner Liste (WAL): 2 seats
Total: 31 seats

Mayors

1901–1907: Knoth, Hermann
1907–1909: Schön, Friederich (temporary)
1909–1919: Nimis, Wilhelm
1919–1920: Helmling, Peter
1920–1925: Scheurich, Otto
1925–1930: Trautmann, Arthur
1930–1933: Geier, Michael
1933: Kaufmann, Josef
1933–1940: Kiefer, Karl (appointed)
1940–1945: Leiblein, Josef (appointed)
1945–1946: Trunk, Heinrich (temporary) und Scheurich, Otto (temporary)
1946–1948: Schmidt, Hermann
1948–1966: Trautmann, Arthur (SPD)
1966–1974: Hübner, Alfred
1974–1975: Hollerbach, Robert (temporary administrator)
1975–1991: Hollerbach, Robert (CDU)
1991–2007: Joseph, Karl-Heinz (SPD)
since 2007: Günther, Markus (CDU)

Sons and daughters of the city 

 Walter Zimmermann (1892-1980), biologist and botanist
 Peter Assion (1941-1994), ethnologist and germanist
 Peter Hauk (born 1960), forest manager, politician and Member of Landtag since 1992 (CDU), 
 Silvia Neid (born 1964), former footballer and world champion coach of the German women's football team

See also

References

Neckar-Odenwald-Kreis